William George Smart Sr. (25 April 1894 – 25 September 1966) was a British showman, fairground proprietor and circus proprietor, the founder and owner of Billy Smart's Circus.

Biography

Born in London, Billy Smart was one of 23 children in a family that worked on fairgrounds in London and South East England.  After marrying in 1925, he and his brothers set up their own fair, which became a regular attraction in the region. Billy Smart's Fun Fair featured alongside Bertram Mills' Circus at Olympia in 1939 and, during the Second World War, Smart ran several Holiday at Home Fairs, to boost morale.

In 1946, he purchased the big top of Cody's Circus, and opened his own New World Circus.  Its first show was in Southall on 5 April 1946.  At first, the circus ran in conjunction with the existing funfair, but the latter was phased out by 1952, and Smart's circus toured with a full menagerie of animals. In 1954, the existing big top was replaced by one with a capacity of 6,000 seats, a hippodrome track around the ring, and a grand entrance hall allowing spectacular parades to take place. Smart pioneered centrally-heated dark blue rather than light coloured tents, which had compromised lighting effects.

Smart arranged for the televising of his circus from 1947, as the first BBC location live TV show. This led to regular Christmas shows on the BBC, including the 1977 Royal Jubilee Big Top Show, organised by his son David Smart, which was attended by Queen Elizabeth II and the Duke of Edinburgh, and raised several million pounds for charity. In the 1960s, the Billy Smart's TV show was the first UK TV programme to attract more than 20 million viewers in the UK. Between 1979 and 1982, the circus was broadcast on ITV.

The circus grew to become one of the largest in the world. It was the world's largest travelling circus under canvas in the 1960s, according to King Pole magazine, with a permanent base at Winkfield, Berkshire.  Smart himself took part in his shows, and led many stunts to publicise the circus.

Around 1961, Smart offered £1 million to buy Blackpool Tower, and also headed a consortium hoping to involve Disney in what would have become the first Disney amusement park in Europe; however, the venture did not proceed. Smart then decided upon a novel concept, a safari park, and, after years of searching for a suitable site, bought a property near Windsor for this purpose. The Windsor Safari Park was brought to fruition by his sons, Ronald, David and Stanley (known as Billy Jr), after his death, and grew to attract up to 2.5 million visitors per year.

He was the subject of This Is Your Life in 1956 when he was surprised by Eamonn Andrews at the King's Theatre, Hammersmith, London.
 
Billy Smart died in 1966, in his caravan shortly after conducting a band in front of his circus tent at Ipswich.   His friend Sir Billy Butlin described him as "the greatest showman of our time and probably the last of the great showmen."

Family
Billy Smart Jr., son, circus performer and circus director
David Smart, son, circus performer and circus director

References

David Jamieson, Billy Smart's Circus, A Pictorial History. Buntingford, Aardvark Publishing, 2004.
"Spinners of the Big Top" by Pamela Macgregor-Morris

External links
 Kate Dodd, "50 years since final curtain came down on legendary showman Billy Smart’s life", Ipswich Star, 27 September 2016
 Billy Smart's Circus in Glasgow, 1954, British Pathé

1894 births
1966 deaths
Circus owners
20th-century British businesspeople